Minot City Transit, also known as City Bus, is a fixed-route public transport service in the city of Minot, North Dakota. Operating Hours are 7:00 AM to 7:00 PM Monday-Friday.

A 1977 built Minot City Transit bus, constructed by the American Motors General Metropolitan and modeled after a Canadian bus, was donated to the Midwest Bus Museum in 2021.

General Information

Transit service
Standard fixed-route transit service is provided on six routes, with three routes departing half-hourly from the central stop at Minot City Auditorium.  Hours of operation are from 7:00 am to 7:00 pm. Buses operate on a flag-down system, meaning that bus will stop at any street corner when waved down by a rider.

Fare Categories and Cost

 Cash fare - $1.50 (exact fare, no change is given back) 
 One day Ride Pass - $5.00
 Children under six - Free of Charge
 Transfers - Free of Charge

Route list

(North) Goes to Minot State and then to the marketplace.
(East) Goes to Henry Towers Medical Arts, Roosevelt Park Zoo, state fair, the public works, and central campus.
(South1) Goes to marketplace foods, near Kmart, Dakota Square Mall, Cashwise, and Walmart Supercenter.
(West) Goes to Jim Hill Arrowhead shopping center, Minot State, karma market (B&D market), and central campus.
(South2) Goes to Henry towers Kmart which is still open home depot, Jim Hill.
(Northcentral) Goes to the public library, Minot State, Lewis and Clark Elementary, near the airport, karma market (B&D market) and central campus.

Major Stops and Points of Interest 

 Marketplace Foods (16th Avenue)
 Marketplace Foods (South Broadway)
 Dakota Square Mall (2400 10th st)
 Cashwise Foods (3208 16th st)
 Walmart (3900 S Broadway)
 Home Depot (3425 S Broadway)
 Menards (101 28th Ave)
 K-Mart (1 20th Ave)

Fixed Route Ridership

The ridership and service statistics shown here are of fixed route services only and do not include demand response.

See also
Minot station
Bis-Man Transit
Cities Area Transit

References

External links
Minot City Transit page
Transit Booklet 11518 Updated
General Information and Routes
Minot City Transit Route Changes

Bus transportation in North Dakota
Minot, North Dakota